A digital signal is an analog signal that represents digital data. 

Digital signal may also refer to:

Digital signal (signal processing), a discrete time, quantized representation of an analog signal
Digital data signal
Signals in digital broadcasting
Signals in digital electronics
Signals in digital data transmission
Signals in digital telephony